The 2011–12 New Mexico State Aggies men's basketball team represented New Mexico State University during the 2011–12 NCAA Division I men's basketball season. The Aggies, led by fifth year head coach Marvin Menzies, played their home games at Pan American Center and are members of the Western Athletic Conference. They finished the season 26–10, 10–4 in WAC play to finish in second place. They were champions of WAC Basketball tournament to earn the conference's automatic bid into the 2012 NCAA tournament where they lost in the second round to Indiana.

Previous season 
The Aggies finished the season 16-17, 9-7 in WAC play to finish tied for third place.

Departures

Incoming Transfers

2011 Recruiting Class

Roster

Schedule

|-
!colspan=9 style=| Exhibition

|-
!colspan=9 style=| Regular season

|-
!colspan=9 style=| WAC Tournament

|-
!colspan=9 style=| NCAA Tournament

References

New Mexico State Aggies men's basketball seasons
New Mexico State
New Mexico State
Aggies
Aggies